

Events

1870
 The first of Lobengula's royal towns called Bulawayo, is founded in 1870 (and will be destroyed in 1881).

1871
 Europeans start to excavate the late Iron Age's capital city, Great Zimbabwe
 The border post Mpandamatenga established close to modern Botswana

1872
 Tati Concessions Land in the Matabele kingdom granted to Sir John Swinburne

1873

1874

1875

1876
 Zambesi Mission, a Catholic prefecture division is established

1877

1878

1879

Births
 Wardlaw Brown Thomson, rugby union international born in Matabeleland
 Fraser Russell, 3 time governor of Southern Rhodesia (dies 1952)
 Alfred Mulock Bentley, founder of the Rhodesian Stock Exchange (dies 1952)

See also

1860s in Zimbabwe
other events of 1870s
1880s in Zimbabwe
Years in Zimbabwe

References

 
Decades in Zimbabwe
Zimbabwe